Azan Abbas Sabil Al-Balushi (born 5 May 1990), commonly known as Azan Al-Balushi, is an Omani footballer who plays for Al-Nasr in Oman Professional League.

Club career statistics

International career
Azan is part of the first team squad of the Oman national football team. He was selected for the national team for the first time in 2012. He made his first appearance for Oman on 8 November 2012 in a friendly match against Estonia in 2012. He has represented the national team in the 2014 FIFA World Cup qualification and in the 2015 AFC Asian Cup qualification.

References

External links
 
 
 Azan Al-Balushi at Goal.com
 
 

1990 births
Living people
Omani footballers
Oman international footballers
Association football defenders
Al-Musannah SC players
Al-Shabab SC (Seeb) players
Oman Professional League players
Omani people of Baloch descent